Clive William Leach CBE (born 4 December 1934) is a former English cricketer. He was a right-handed batsman who bowled slow left-arm orthodox. He was born in Bombay, Bombay State, India.

Cricket career
Leach made his first-class debut for Warwickshire against Cambridge University in 1955. He played 38 further first-class matches for Warwickshire, the last coming against Oxford University in 1958. In his 39 first-class matches for Warwickshire, he scored 1,025 runs at a batting average of 17.67, with 4 half centuries and a high score of 67. An able slip fielder, he took 28 catches. An all-rounder, Leach took 26 wickets at a bowling average of 25.26, with best figures of 3/19.

After being released by Warwickshire, Leach joined Durham for the 1959 season, making his Minor Counties Championship debut against Northumberland. He played Minor counties cricket for Durham from 1959 to 1965. It was for Durham that he made his List A debut against Hertfordshire in the 1964 Gillette Cup. He played a further List A match for Durham, which came in the same season against Sussex.

Leach later joined Buckinghamshire, making his debut for the county in the 1966 Minor Counties Championship against Berkshire. He played Minor counties cricket for Buckinghamshire from 1966 to 1971. He made 3 List A appearances for Buckinghamshire, against Middlesex in the 1969 Gillette Cup, Bedfordshire and Hampshire, both in the 1970 Gillette Cup.

Later life
Following the end of his cricket career, Leach began his business career in 1961 at the age of 27 when he began a career in television. He started with Tyne Tees Television.  At the time he retired from television in 1994, Leach was the Chairman and Chief executive of Yorkshire-Tyne Tees Television plc.  In 2000 he was awarded the CBE for his services to training and education.

Subsequently Leach carried out a number of senior public sector roles in the Yorkshire and Leeds City regions between 1995 and 2005, including as Chairman of the Yorkshire Training and Enterprise Council, The Leeds Learning and Skills Council and Yorkshire Enterprise Ltd. He was Chairman of the Leeds Health Authority spearheading the merger between the Leeds General Infirmary and St James' Hospital. He took over as Chairman of Yorkshire Fund Managers in 2008. He also took over as Chairman of Be Independent Ltd, a company supporting independence for old and disabled people in the York City area in 2016.  Leach is a past president of Harrogate International Festivals.

In 2004 Leach was appointed Chairman of the Durham County Cricket Club, by this time a club with first class status.  He stepped down in 2016 during negotiations with the English Cricket Board over financial disagreement with them. In the 12 years as Chairman, Durham won three County Championship titles and two major cup trophies, and held their first Test matches including an "Ashes" test. He was succeeded by Sir Ian Botham.

Clive Leach is currently owner and Chairman of the Universe Media Group Ltd, publishers of Catholic Universe, the largest circulation Catholic weekly newspaper; the Catholic Times; and the Church and Heritage Building magazine. On 10 June 2021 it was announced that The Catholic Universe and Catholic Times newspapers would close with immediate effect with that week’s editions being the last.

He was awarded a Papal Knighthood - KSG - in March 2018 for services to the Catholic faith.

References

External links
Clive Leach at ESPNcricinfo
Clive Leach at CricketArchive

1934 births
Living people
Cricketers from Mumbai
English cricketers
Warwickshire cricketers
Durham cricketers
Buckinghamshire cricketers
Commanders of the Order of the British Empire
English cricket administrators